Mangelia multilineolata is a species of sea snail, a marine gastropod mollusk in the family Mangeliidae.

Description
The size of an adult shell varies between 4 mm and 10 mm.

The shell contains rather numerous longitudinal ribs, close together, curved white, with chestnut, revolving lines, rarely unicolored or unifasciate.

Distribution
This species occurs in the Mediterranean Sea and in the Atlantic Ocean off the Azores.

References

 Risso, A., 1826 Histoire naturelle des principales productions de l'Europe Méridionale et particulièrement de celles des environs de Nice et des Alpes-Maritimes. Mollusques, vol. 4, p. 1-439, 12 pls
 Arnaud, P. M., 1978 Révision des taxa malacologiques méditerrannéens introduits par Antoine Risso Annales du Muséum d'Histoire Naturelle de Nice, "1977"5 101–150
 Gofas, S.; Le Renard, J.; Bouchet, P. (2001). Mollusca, in: Costello, M.J. et al. (Ed.) (2001). European register of marine species: a check-list of the marine species in Europe and a bibliography of guides to their identification. Collection Patrimoines Naturels, 50: pp. 180–213

External links
 
  Tucker, J.K. 2004 Catalog of recent and fossil turrids (Mollusca: Gastropoda). Zootaxa 682:1–1295.
 MNHN, Paris : Mangelia lineolata (lectotype)

multilineolata
Gastropods described in 1835